Maksim Kahan (25 January 1918 – 18 May 2006) was an Israeli sports shooter. He competed in the trap event at the 1964 Summer Olympics.

References

External links

1918 births
2006 deaths
Israeli male sport shooters
Olympic shooters of Israel
Shooters at the 1964 Summer Olympics
Place of birth missing